Sucre is a town and municipality in the Santander Department in northeastern Colombia.

Climate
Sucre has a subtropical highland climate (Köppen Cfb) with heavy rainfall year-round.

References

Municipalities of Santander Department